Župa is a Slavic administrative unit.

Župa may also refer to:

Places
 župa (geographical region)
 Župa (region), a region in Serbia
 , a region in Serbia
 Letnička župa, a region in Serbia / Kosovo
 Sirinićka župa, a region in Serbia / Kosovo
 Sredačka župa, a region in Serbia / Kosovo
Župa, Split-Dalmatia County a village in Croatia
Župa Srednja, a village in Split-Dalmatia County, Croatia
 Župa, Trbovlje, a village in Slovenia
 Župa, Trebinje, a village in Bosnia and Herzegovina
 Župa (Tutin), a village in Serbia
 Župa dubrovačka, a municipality in Croatia
 Župa, Danilovgrad, a village in Montenegro

People
 Richard Župa (born 1998), a Slovak footballer

Other uses
 FK Župa, a football club from Aleksandrovac, Serbia, in the 2007–08 Serbian League East